Pir Abdul Rehman is a town of Ahmedpur Sial Tehsil, Jhang District, Punjab province, Pakistan. It is situated about 6 km north of Ahmed Pur Sial. Here is the shrine of Pir Abdul Rehman (Tabih). He was the son of Abbas bin Rabi'ah. The birth of Pir Abdul Rehman is in 37 hijri and Came in India about in 86 hijri. He died in 122 hijri.

References 

Populated places in Jhang District